Blackbird is a 2019 American drama film directed by Roger Michell and written by Christian Torpe. It is a remake of the 2014 Danish film Silent Heart, also written by Torpe. It stars Susan Sarandon, Kate Winslet, Mia Wasikowska, Lindsay Duncan, Rainn Wilson, Bex Taylor-Klaus, and Sam Neill.

It had its world premiere at the Toronto International Film Festival on September 6, 2019. It was released on September 18, 2020, by Screen Media Films.

Premise
A dying mother assembles her family to spend a final weekend together before she ends her life.

Cast
 Susan Sarandon as Lily
 Kate Winslet as Jennifer
 Mia Wasikowska as Anna
 Sam Neill as Paul
 Lindsay Duncan as Liz
 Rainn Wilson as Michael
 Bex Taylor-Klaus as Chris
 Anson Boon as Jonathan

Production
The remake was announced in July 2018, with Kate Winslet, Diane Keaton and Mia Wasikowska cast to play members of the family. Roger Michell was announced as director, with filming initially set to begin in August.

Filming began in October, with Keaton replaced by Susan Sarandon, and Sam Neill, Rainn Wilson, Bex Taylor-Klaus and Lindsay Duncan cast in supporting roles. The beachside house used in the film is located next to Winslet's own home near West Wittering in West Sussex, with the South Coast of England doubling for The Hamptons.

Release
The film had its world premiere at the Toronto International Film Festival on September 6, 2019. In May 2020, Screen Media Films acquired distribution rights to the film. It was released on September 18, 2020.

Reception
On Rotten Tomatoes, the film has an approval rating of  based on reviews from  critics. The site's critics consensus states: "Blackbird wastes its premise on shallow storytelling, though its splendid cast adds heart to a sensitive subject." On Metacritic, the film has a weighted average score of 53 out of 100, based on reviews from 18 critics, indicating "mixed of average reviews".

References

External links
 

2019 films
2019 drama films
American drama films
American remakes of Danish films
Drama film remakes
Films about diseases
Films about euthanasia
Films about suicide
Films shot in West Sussex
Films directed by Roger Michell
Films about families
Films about sisters
Films about mother–daughter relationships
2010s English-language films
2010s American films